The Green Party of England and Wales (GPEW; , , often simply the Green Party or Greens) is a green, left-wing political party in England and Wales. Since October 2021, Carla Denyer and Adrian Ramsay have served as the party's co-leaders. The party currently has one representative in the House of Commons and two in the House of Lords, in addition to hundreds of councillors at the local government level and three members of the London Assembly.

The party's ideology combines environmentalism with left-wing economic policies, including well-funded and locally controlled public services. It advocates a steady-state economy with the regulation of capitalism, and supports proportional representation. It takes a progressive approach to social policies such as civil liberties, animal rights, LGBT rights, and drug policy reform. The party also believes strongly in non-violence, universal basic income, a living wage, and democratic participation. It is split into various regional divisions, including the semi-autonomous Wales Green Party, and is internationally affiliated with the Global Greens and the European Green Party.

Alongside the Scottish Greens and the Green Party Northern Ireland, the party was established in 1990 through the division of the pre-existing Green Party, which had initially been established as the PEOPLE Party in 1973. The party went through centralising reforms spearheaded by the Green 2000 group in early 1990, and also sought to emphasise growth in local governance, doing so throughout 1990. In 2010, the party gained its first Member of Parliament in its then-leader Caroline Lucas. As the party's support is spread out across the UK, and is rarely found in electorally significant clusters, the party holds only one seat in the House of Commons. The Green Party supports an abolition of the UK's first-past-the-post voting system, and instead supports proportional representation, which would grant it more seats in Parliament.

History

Origins (1972–1990)
The Green Party of England and Wales has its origins in the PEOPLE Party, which was founded in Coventry in November 1972. It was renamed to the Ecology Party in 1975 and, in 1985, changed again to the Green Party. In 1989, the party's Scottish branch evolved to establish the independent Scottish Green Party, with an independent Green Party in Northern Ireland evolving shortly after, leaving the branches in England and Wales to form their own party. The Green Party of England and Wales is registered with the Electoral Commission, only as "the Green Party". In the 1989 European Parliament elections, the Green Party polled 15% of the vote with 2.3 million votes, the best performance of a "green" party in a nationwide election. This election gave the Green Party the third-largest share of the vote after the Conservative and Labour parties, although because of the first-past-the-post voting system, it failed to gain a seat. Many say the success of the party is due to increased respect for environmentalism and the effects of the development boom in southern England in the late 1980s.

Early years (1990–2008)
Seeking to capitalise on the Greens' success in the European Parliament elections, a group named Green 2000 was established in July 1990, arguing for an internal reorganisation of the party in order to develop it into an active electoral force capable of securing seats in the House of Commons. Its proposed reforms included a more centralised structure, the replacement of the existing party council with a smaller party executive, and the establishment of delegate voting at party conferences. Many party members opposed the reforms, believing that they would undermine the party's internal democracy and, amid the arguments, some members left the party. Although Green 2000 proposals were defeated at the party's 1990 conference, they were overwhelmingly carried at their 1991 conference, resulting in an internal restructuring of the party. Between the end of 1990 and mid-1992, the party lost over half its members, with those polled indicating that frustration over a lack of clear and effective party leadership was a significant reason in their decision. The party fielded more candidates than it had ever done before in the 1992 general election but performed poorly.

In 1993, the party adopted its "Basis for Renewal" program in an attempt to bring together conflicting factions and thus saved the party from bankruptcy and potential demise. The party sought to escape its reputation as an environmentalist single-issue party by placing greater emphasis on social policies.

Recognising their poor performance in the 1992 national elections, the party decided to focus on gaining support in local elections, targeting wards where there was a pre-existing support base of Green activists. In 1993, future party leader and MP Caroline Lucas gained a seat in Oxfordshire County Council, with other gains following in the 1995 and 1996 local elections.

The Greens sought to build alliances with other parties in the hope of gaining representation at the parliamentary level. In Wales, the Greens endorsed Plaid Cymru candidate Cynog Dafis in the 1992 general election, having worked with him on several environmental initiatives. For the 1997 general election, the Ceredigion branch of the Greens endorsed Cynog Dafis as a joint Plaid Cymru/Green candidate, but this generated controversy with the party, with critics believing it improper to build an alliance with a party that did not share all of the Greens' views. In April 1995, the Green National Executive ruled that the party should withdraw from this alliance due to ideological differences.

As the Labour Party shifted to the political centre under the leadership of Tony Blair and his New Labour project, the Greens sought to gain the support of the party's disaffected leftists.

During the 1999 European Parliament elections, the first to be held in the UK using proportional representation, the Greens gained their first Members of the European Parliament (MEPs), Lucas (South East England) and Jean Lambert (London). At the inaugural London Assembly Elections in 2000, the party gained 11% of the vote and returned three Assembly Members (AMs). Although this dropped to two following the 2004 London Assembly elections, the Green AMs proved vital in passing the annual budget of former Mayor Ken Livingstone.

At the 2001 general election, they polled 0.7% of the vote and gained no seats. At the 2004 European Parliamentary elections, the party returned 2 MEPs the same as in 1999; overall, the party polled 1,033,093 votes. In the 2005 general election, the party gained over 1% of the vote for the first time and polled over 10% in the constituencies of Brighton Pavilion and Lewisham Deptford. This growth was due in part to the increasing public visibility of the party as well as growth in support for smaller parties in the UK.

Caroline Lucas (2008–2012)

In November 2007, the party held an internal referendum to decide on whether it should replace its use of two "principal speakers", one male and the other female, with the more conventional roles of "leader" and "deputy leader"; the motion passed with 73% of the vote. In September 2008, the party then elected its first leader, Caroline Lucas, with Adrian Ramsay elected deputy leader. In the party's first election with Lucas as leader, it retained both its MEPs in the 2009 European elections.

In the 2010 general election, the party returned its first MP. Lucas was returned as MP for the seat of Brighton Pavilion. Following the election, Keith Taylor succeeded her as MEP for South East England. They also saved their deposit in Hove, and Brighton Kemptown.

In the 2011 local government elections in England and Wales, the Green Party in Brighton and Hove took minority control of the City Council by winning 23 seats, 5 short of an overall majority.

At the 2012 local government elections, the Green Party gained 5 seats and retained both AMs at the 2012 London Assembly election. At the 2012 London mayoral election the party's candidate Jenny Jones finished third and lost her deposit.

Natalie Bennett (2012–2016)
In May 2012, Lucas announced that she would not seek re-election to the post of party leader. In September, Australian-born former journalist Natalie Bennett was elected party leader and Will Duckworth deputy leader in the leadership election took place. Bennett would take the party further to the left, aiming to make it an anti-austerity party to the left of the Labour Party.

The 2013 local government elections saw overall gains of 5 seats. The party returned representation for the first time on the councils of Cornwall, Devon, and Essex. At the local government elections the following year, the Greens gained 18 seats overall. In London, the party won four seats, a gain of two, holding seats in Camden and Lewisham, and gaining seats in Islington and Lambeth.

At the 2014 European elections, the Green Party finished fourth, above the Liberal Democrats, winning over 1.2 million votes. The party also increased its European Parliament representation, gaining one seat in the South West England region.

In September 2014, the Green Party held its 2014 leadership elections. Incumbent leader Bennett ran uncontested and retained her status as a party leader. The election also saw a change in the elective format for the position of deputy leader. The party opted to elect two, gender-balanced deputy leaders, instead of one. Amelia Womack and Shahrar Ali won the two positions, succeeding former deputy leader Duckworth.

In the 2010 general election, the Green Party contested roughly 50% of seats. The party announced in October 2014 that Green candidates would be standing for parliament in at least 75% of constituencies in the 2015 general election. Following its rapid increase in membership and support, the Green Party also announced it was targeting twelve key seats for the 2015 general election: its one current seat, Brighton Pavilion, held by Lucas since 2010, Norwich South, a Liberal Democrat seat where June 2014 polling put the Greens in second place behind Labour, Bristol West, another Liberal Democrat seat, where they targeted the student vote, St. Ives, where they received an average of 18% of the vote in county elections, Sheffield Central, Liverpool Riverside, Oxford East, Solihull, Reading East, and three more seats with high student populations – York Central, Cambridge, and Holborn and St. Pancras, where leader Bennett stood as the candidate.

In December 2014, the Green Party announced that it had more than doubled its overall membership from 1 January that year to 30,809. This reflected the increase seen in opinion polls in 2014, with Green Party voting intentions trebling from 2–3% at the start of the year, to 7–8% at the end of the year, on many occasions, coming in fourth place with YouGov's national polls, ahead of the Liberal Democrats, and gaining over 25% of the vote with 18 to 24-year-olds. This rapid increase in support for the party is referred to by media as the "Green Surge". The hashtag "#GreenSurge" has also been popular on social media (such as Twitter) from Green Party members and supporters and, the combined Green Party membership in the UK stood at 44,713; greater than the number of members of UKIP (at 41,943), and the Liberal Democrats (at 44,576).

Views subsequently fell back as the 2015 general election opinion polls arrived: a Press Association poll of polls on 3 April, for example, put the Greens fifth with 5.4%. However, membership statistics continued to surge with the party attaining 60,000 in England and Wales that April.

At the 2015 general election, Lucas was re-elected in Brighton Pavilion with an increased majority, but the party did not win any other seats. In part due to the greatly increased the number of contested seats of 538 from the 310 at the 2010 election, the Greens received their highest-ever vote share (over 1.1 million votes), and increased their national share of the vote from 1% to 3.8%. Overnight, the membership numbers increased to over 63,000. However, at the local government elections the party lost 9 out of their 20 seats on the Brighton and Hove council, losing minority control. Nationwide, the Greens increased their share of councillors, gaining an additional 10 council seats while failing to gain overall control of any individual council.

Lucas and Bartley (2016–2018)
On 15 May 2016, Bennett announced she would not be standing for re-election in the party's biennial leadership election due to take place in the summer. Former leader Lucas and Jonathan Bartley announced two weeks later that they intended to stand for leadership as a job share arrangement. Nominations closed at the end of June, with the campaign period taking place in July and voting period in August and the results announced at the party's Autumn Conference in Birmingham from 2–4 September. It was announced on 4 September that Lucas and Bartley would become the party's leaders in a job share.

Lucas first suggested "progressive pacts" to work on a number of issues including combating climate change and for electoral reform, following the results of the 2015 general election. She then reiterated the call alongside Bartley as they announced their plan to share the leadership of the party. Following the vote to leave the European Union in June 2016, Bennett published an open letter, calling for an "anti-Brexit alliance" potentially comprising Labour, the Liberal Democrats and Plaid Cymru to stand in a future snap election in English and Welsh seats. The Green Party stood in 457 seats in the 2017 general election, securing 1.6% of the overall vote, and an average of 2.2% in seats it stood in. While it was a disappointing result after the 2015 success, this was still the second-best Green result in a general election, and Brighton Pavilion remained Green with an increased majority.

On 30 May 2018, Lucas announced she would not seek re-election in the 2018 Green Party of England and Wales leadership election and would stand down as co-leader. On 1 June 2018 Bartley announced a co-leadership bid alongside Siân Berry, former candidate for the Mayor of London in 2008 and 2016.

Bartley and Berry (2018–2021)
Bartley and Berry were elected as co-leaders in September 2018, winning 6,279 of 8,329 votes. In the 2019 local elections, the Green Party secured their best ever local election result, more than doubling their number of council seats from 178 to 372 councillors. This success was followed by a similarly successful European election where Greens won (including Scottish Greens and the Green Party in Northern Ireland) over two million votes for the first time since 1989, securing 7 MEPs, up from 3. This included winning seats for the first time in the East of England, North West England, West Midlands and Yorkshire & the Humber.

The membership also saw another climb in 2019, returning to 50,000 members in September.

In September 2020, it was announced that Bartley and Berry had won re-election for another two-year term.

In the 2021 local elections, the Green Party gained their first ever councillors in Northumberland and Stockport, as well as making significant gains in Suffolk and Sheffield. In total 88 seats were gained, challenging the Liberal Democrats to become England's third-largest party.

In July 2021, Bartley announced that he would stand down at the end of the month to give the party time to choose new leadership before the next general election. This triggered the 2021 Green Party of England and Wales leadership election. Berry remained as acting leader, but said she would not stand in the leadership election following disagreements within the party.

Denyer and Ramsay (2021–present) 

The Bristol councillor Carla Denyer and the former deputy leader Adrian Ramsay were elected as co-leaders on 1 October 2021. Ramsay stated that "People are looking for a positive alternative to the establishment parties, and finding it in the Greens"; in the first national electoral test of the new leadership in the local elections held in May 2022 the Green Party made a net gain of 71 seats - including in both Conservative and Labour "safe seats".

On 7 September 2022, it was announced that Zack Polanski had been elected as the party's new deputy leader, defeating three election opponents and replacing Amelia Womack, who chose not to re-stand for the position in the election.

In October 2022, at their national conference the Scottish Greens voted to sever ties with the Green Party of England and Wales, specially over the issues of transphobia.

Ideology and policy

Sociologist Chris Rootes stated that the Green Party took "the left-libertarian" vote, while Dennison and Goodwin characterised it as reflecting "libertarian-universalistic values". The party wants an end to big government – which they see as hindering open and transparent democracy – and want to limit the power of big business – which, they argue, upholds the unsustainable trend of globalisation, and is detrimental to local trade and economies. There have been allegations of factionalism and infighting in the Green Party between liberal, socialist, and anarchist factions.

The Green Party publishes a party platform: a full set of its policies, as approved by successive party conferences, collectively entitled Policies for a Sustainable Society (originally The Manifesto for a Sustainable Society before February 2010).

Manifesto
The party publishes a manifesto for each of its election campaigns. Separate from this, the Greens have a set of Core Values, a Philosophical Basis and a series of Long-term Goals.

For the 2015 general election, the party's manifesto outlined many new policies, including a Robin Hood tax on banks and a 60% tax on those earning over £150,000.

For the 2019 general election, the party's manifesto had four key sections: "remain and transform", which advocated for the UK to reverse its decision to leave the EU and increase cross-border co-operation with the EU; "grow democracy", which aimed to overhaul the UK's current voting system and rebalance government power by lowering the voting age from 18 to 16 and redefining the jurisdiction of local governments; the "green quality of life guarantee", which addressed social issues such as housing, the NHS, education, countryside conservation, discrimination, crime, drug reform, animal rights, and the implementation of a universal basic income; and the "new deal for tax and spend", which outlined the party's economic policies such as simplifying income tax, increasing corporation tax to make big businesses pay their fair share, supporting small business, and ending wasteful spending.

Economic policy
The Green Party believes in "an economy that works for all". This includes radical steps to eliminate poverty with ambitious social policies such as increasing the minimum wage in line with the living wage. They also want to introduce a four-day working week; which it is claimed would boost productivity and growth, with Mondays and Fridays being the least productive days in the week.

In November 2019, the Greens pledged to introduce a universal basic income by 2025, which will give every adult in the United Kingdom (unemployed or not) at least £89 a week (with additional payments to those facing barriers to work, including disabled people and single parents). This is in order to tackle poverty, give people financial security, give people more freedom of choice to cut their working hours, start a green new business, take part in the community, or improve their own well-being. The policy also aims to tackle the rising levels of automation that threaten to put millions out of work and fundamentally change British industry.

The Green Party wants to raise corporation tax from the current 19%; this is designed to generate more government revenue and ensure large corporations do not become too powerful. The party wants to end subsidies for fossil fuels and replace them with subsidies for renewable energy sources such as wind, solar power and tidal power. Investment in green energy could potentially create more jobs and boost the economy. The environmental economic policy also includes a Green deal that the Green Party say will generate new jobs and reduce Britain's energy costs. The Green Party wants to increase Britain's development and its position on the Human Development Index and free time index. They believe that uncontrolled economic growth has contributed to pollution and global warming and that more steps should be taken to ensure that growth is sustainable and keeps environmental damage to a minimum.

The party supports bringing energy and water companies into public ownership. They have also called for social care to be free at the point of use.

Environmental policy
The party states that it would phase out fossil fuel-based power generation, and would work toward closing coal-fired power stations as soon as possible. The Green Party would also remove subsidies for nuclear power within ten years and work towards phasing out nuclear energy. The party aims for the UK to become carbon neutral. The Green Party Manifesto states:The UK should base its future emissions budgets on the principles of science and equity and the aim of keeping global warming below 1.5 C. These principles entail the UK reducing its own emissions to net-zero by 2030 and seeking to reduce the emissions embedded in its imports to zero as soon as possible. The urgency of these objectives requires the UK to make overcoming the technological, political and social obstacles a national priority.The Green Party wants to set up an environmental protection committee to ensure the protection of habitats and to enhance biodiversity.

Foreign policy and defence

Since at least 1992, the party has emphasised unilateral nuclear disarmament and called for rejection of the UK's Trident nuclear missile programme. To campaign for the latter, it has teamed up with the organisation, Campaign for Nuclear Disarmament (CND), and the political parties, Plaid Cymru, and the Scottish National Party (SNP). Former Leader Natalie Bennett has advocated replacing the UK Army with a "home defence force", according to The Telegraph.

The Green Party used to have an outlook in which it stated: "In the long term, it would take the UK out of NATO". 
In 2014, Natalie Bennett led an anti-NATO march in Newport. The party formerly supported withdrawal from NATO, but not before the end of the Russo-Ukrainian War. In March 2023, the party abandoned it's opposition to NATO. Though the party said it supports reform of the organisation in aspects such as guaranteeing a "no first use" policy on nuclear weapons, that NATO commits to upholding human rights, and that the organisation only acts in defence of member states.

The party has opposed the invasion of Iraq, NATO-led military intervention in Libya and British involvement in Saudi Arabian–led intervention in Yemen.

The party campaigns for the rights of indigenous people around the world and argues for greater autonomy for these individuals. Furthermore, they support the granting of compensation and justice for historical wrongs, and that the reappropriation of lands and resources should be granted to certain nations and peoples. The party also believes that the cancelling of international debt should take place immediately and any financial assistance should be in the form of grants and not loans, limiting debt service payments to 10% of export earnings per year.

The Green Party advocate for a less "bully boy culture" from the Western world and more self-sustainability in terms of food and energy policy on a global level, with aid, only being given to countries as a last resort in order to prevent them from being indebted to their donors.

Amid the toughening rhetoric surrounding immigration at the 2015 general election, the Greens issued mugs emblazoned with the slogan "Standing Up For Immigrants". They claimed to offer a "genuine alternative" to the views of the mainstream parties by promoting the removal of restrictions on the number of foreign students, abolishing rules on family migration, and promoting further rights for asylum seekers.

Drug policy
The Green Party has an official drugs group, for drugs policy and research. The party wants to end the prohibition of drugs and create a system of legal regulation in order to minimise the harm associated with drug use as well as the harm associated with its production and supply. The party's view is that people have always used drugs and there will always be people that will use them, and therefore focus should be on minimising the harm associated with drug use and tackling the causes of why people take drugs (e.g. poverty, isolation, mental illness, physical illness, and psychological trauma). This sits alongside the party's belief that adults should be free to make informed decisions about their own drug consumption, while this freedom is also balanced with the government's responsibility to protect individuals and society from harm. The party considers the drugs issue to be a health issue, rather than a criminal one.

The party also supports opening overdose prevention centres in towns and cities in order to prevent fatal overdoses, the transmission of HIV, hepatitis C and other illnesses, as well as offering a place for drug users to access health and treatment services. The party supports devolving the decision-making on whether to open these sites to police, health services and local authorities.

Ian Barnett from the Green Party says that: "The Policy of 'War on Drugs' has clearly failed. We need a different approach to the control and misuse of drugs." However, the party does aim to minimise drug use due to the negative effects on the individual and society at large.

Sexual orientation and gender identity

The stated aim of the sexual orientation and gender identity group within the party, known as LGBTIQA+ Greens, is to raise awareness on LGBTIQA+ rights and issues affecting the broader LGBTIQA+ community, as well as broader Green politics..

The LGBTIQA+ Greens are a Special Interest Group of the party, colloquially known as a Liberation Group. The Co-Chairs of the group are Dylan Lewis-Creser and Cade Hatton 

The 2015 and 2017 general election manifestos contained policies on all teachers to be trained on LGBTIQA+ issues (such as "providing mandatory HIV, sex, and relationships education – age appropriate and LGBTIQA+-inclusive – in all schools from primary level onwards"), on reforming the system of pensions, on ending the "spousal veto" (a measure part of the Gender Recognition Act) and on "mak[ing] equal marriage truly equal". Bennett has also voiced support for polygamy and polyamorous relationships.

The Green Party supports same-sex marriage and, on Brighton and Hove City Council, considered expelling Christina Summers in 2012 due to opposition to same-sex marriage legislation on religious grounds.

Some issues of trans rights have caused divisions in the Green Party, such as when Siân Berry cited opposition to her support for trans rights as a reason for stepping down as co-leader. In the subsequent leadership election, candidate Shahrar Ali's comments on trans rights led to the Young Greens to call for his expulsion. After being sacked as Speaker for the party, Shahrar Ali sued the Green Party, claiming discrimination under the Equality Act. At the 2021 Conference, the Green Party voted in favour of gender self-identification and voted down a motion that women were discriminated against "solely upon their biological sex", which opponents claimed excluded trans women. The Scottish Greens suspended their cooperation with the Green Party of England and Wales in October 2022 due to their views on trans rights.

Transport

The Green party has called for "A People's Transport System" to help deal with the issues not just to the planet but to local communities as well. The Green Party has an official transport working group, aimed at helping to draw up policies to be voted on at the conference.

The party also aims to prioritise accessibility to transport and create equal access irrespective of age, wealth or disability. The party also wants to reduce the total distance people travel and travel journey lengths by encouraging the development and retention of local facilities. It also seeks to reduce the environmental impacts of transport, partly through encouraging transport that makes use of sustainable and replaceable resources. The party would also implement a green transport hierarchy of transport that would need to be followed by all levels of government:

 Walking and disabled access.
 Cycling.
 Public transport (trains, light rail/trams, buses and ferries) and rail and water-borne freight.
 Light goods vehicles, taxis and low powered motorcycles.
 Private motorised transport (cars & high powered motorcycles).
 Heavy goods vehicles.
 Aeroplanes.

One of the flagship and long-standing policies in this field is returning the railways to public ownership along with renationalising other forms of transport.

The party opposes High Speed 2 (HS2), in favour of alternative transport strategies. The party regards the currently under construction railway line as a waste of tax payers money and environmentally destructive. The party is, however, in favour of high speed rail in principle, as a means of challenging short haul domestic flights, provided projects meet strict criteria. The party wishes to divert money invested in HS2 towards other infrastructure projects, such as upgrading and improving local public transport.

Tuition fees
The party supports scrapping university and further education fees. It supports all courses in further education being provided free at the point of use. According to the Green Party:"Under a green government all currently outstanding debts - yet to be paid - held by an individual, for undergraduate tuition fees and maintenance loans, and any resulting interest would be written off. Specifically, those issued by the Student Loans Company (SLC) and currently held by the UK government".

Governance

Global governance
The party campaigns for greater accountability in global governance, with the United Nations made up of elected representatives and more regional representation, as opposed to the current nation-based setup. They want democratic control of the global economy with the World Trade Organization, International Monetary Fund and World Bank reformed, democratised or even replaced. The party also wishes to prioritise social and environmental sustainability as a global policy.

National governance
The party advocates ending the first past the post voting system for UK parliamentary elections and replacing it with a form of proportional representation. The party has also advocated for the inclusion of a Re-open Nominations (RON) option on UK ballot papers.

The Green Party states that they believe there is "no place in government for the hereditary principle". In their long-term goals, they advocate that "The monarchy shall cease to be an office of government. The legislative, executive and judicial roles of the monarch shall cease."

The party supports the separation of church and state. It advocates that the Church of England be disestablished from the British state and become self-governing.

The party supported Scottish independence in the 2014 Scottish independence referendum.

In February 2021, the Green Party announced that it supported a referendum on Welsh independence and would campaign in favour of independence if a referendum were to be held. This came after the Wales Green Party's vote at conference in favour of independence "in the event of a referendum."

European Union
The Green Party was Eurosceptic for the 1994 European Parliament elections.

The party supported the 2016 referendum on the United Kingdom's membership of the European Union, calling it "a vital opportunity to create a more democratic and accountable Europe, with a clearer purpose for the future". The party has criticised the Common Agricultural Policy, the Common Fisheries Policy and the "excessive influence" of the European Commission in comparison to the European Council and European Parliament, describing it as "undemocratic and unaccountable". The party favoured a "three yeses" approach to Europe: "yes to a referendum, yes to major EU reform and yes to staying in a reformed Europe". Bennett also added that:
'Yes to the EU' does not mean we are content with the union continuing to operate as it has in the past. There is a huge democratic deficit in its functioning, a serious bias towards the interests of neoliberalism and 'the market', and central institutions have been overbuilt. But to achieve those reforms we need to work with fellow EU members, not try to dictate high handedly to them, as David Cameron has done.

Organisation

Member groups
There are a number of member groups affiliated to the Green Party.

The youth wing of the Green Party, the Young Greens of England and Wales, has developed independently from around 2002 and is for all Green Party members aged up to 30 years old or in full or part-time education. There is no lower age limit. The Young Greens have their own constitution, national committee, campaigns and meetings, and have become an active presence at Green Party Conferences and election campaigns. There are now many Young Greens groups on UK university, college and higher-education institution campuses. Many Green Party councillors are Young Greens, as are some members of GPEx and other internal party organs.

Other groups:
 Green Left
 Green Party Disability Group
 Green Party Trade Union Group
 Green Party Women
 Green Seniors
 Greens for Animal Protection
 Greens of Colour
 LGBTIQA+ Greens

Membership and finances
The Green Party rely more on membership income than other parties.  In 2014, membership income made up 23% of Green Party income (compared to just 2% of Conservative Party and 9% of Liberal Democrat incomes).  As Prof Catherine Rowett, Ethics adviser to the Prime Minister, explains: "Money pays for leaflets, campaigns, staff time. Big parties have huge donors who want a reward in the form of corrupt access to government. We run a clean campaign with money from our members. Little bits of money, whatever you can afford".

Membership increased rapidly in 2014, more than doubling in that year. On 15 January 2015, the Green Party claimed that the combined membership of the UK Green Parties (Green Party of England and Wales, Scottish Greens, and Green Party Northern Ireland) had risen to 43,829 members, surpassing UKIP's membership of 41,966, and making it the third-largest UK-wide political party in the UK in terms of membership. On 14 January 2015, The Guardian had reported that membership of the combined UK Green Parties was closing on those of UKIP and the Liberal Democrats, but noted that it lagged behind that of the Scottish National Party (SNP), which at the time had a membership of 92,187 members but is not a UK-wide party. Membership of the party peaked at over 67,000 members in the summer of 2015 after the general election, but later declined subsequent to Jeremy Corbyn becoming leader of the Labour Party.

For the year ending 31 December 2019, Green Party income had increased to £3,454,562 and expenditure to £3,177,323.

Support base

According to political scientist Sarah Birch, the Green Party draws support from "a wide spectrum of the population". In 1995, sociologist Chris Rootes stated that the Green Party "appeals disproportionately to younger, highly educated professional people", although he noted that this support base was "not predominantly urban". In 2009, Birch noted that the Green's strongest areas of support were Labour-held seats in university towns or urban areas with relatively large student populations. She noted that there were also strong correlations between areas of high Green support and high percentages of people who define themselves as having no religion.

Birch noted that sociological polling revealed a "strong relationship" between individuals having voted for the Liberal Democrats in the past and holding favourable views of the Green Party, noting that the two groups were competing for "similar sorts of voters".

Electoral representation

The party has one member of Parliament, two members of the House of Lords and three members of the London Assembly.

House of Commons
Brighton Pavilion was the Green Party's first and only parliamentary seat to date, won at the 2010 general election and held in 2015, 2017 and 2019. As with other small parties, representation at the House of Commons has been hindered by the first-past-the-post voting system, meaning the party is highly under-represented; it received 835,589 votes accounting for 2.7% of total votes, but only 0.2%, or one, of the seats.

House of Lords
The party's first life peer was Tim Beaumont, who defected from the Liberal Democrat group of peers in 1999, spoke frequently in the house and died in 2008. Baroness Jenny Jones became the next peer, 2013–present. Former party leader Baroness Natalie Bennett joined her in 2019. She was appointed on the back of continued strong election results for the party, through Theresa May's resignation honours list.

European Parliament
Since the first UK election to the European Parliament with proportional representation, in June 1999, the Green Party of England and Wales has had representation in the European Parliament. From 1999 to 2010, the two MEPs were Jean Lambert (London) and Lucas (South East England). In 2010, on election to the House of Commons, Lucas resigned her seat and was succeeded by Keith Taylor. In May 2014, Taylor and Lambert held their seats, and were joined by Molly Scott Cato who was elected in the South West region, increasing the number of Green Party Members of the European Parliament to three for the first time. In May 2019, this number rose to seven: Scott Ainslie (London), Ellie Chowns (West Midlands), Gina Dowding (North West England), Magid Magid (Yorkshire and the Humber), Alexandra Phillips (South East England), Catherine Rowett (East of England), and the re-elected Scott Cato.

Local government
The party has representation at local government level in England and Wales. From the early 1990s until 2009, the number of Green local councillors rose from none to over 100.

In 2011, the party led a council for the first time when they took minority control of Brighton and Hove City Council following the 2011 Brighton and Hove City Council election.

In 2018, the party won its first seat on Birmingham City Council, leaving Newcastle and Cardiff as the only major UK cities which have never elected a Green councillor.

The 2019 United Kingdom local elections saw 194 gains for the party, with over 9% of the national vote.

In July 2020, the Green Party again took minority control of Brighton and Hove City Council following the collapse of the Labour Party's minority administration.

Following the 2021 United Kingdom local elections, the Green Party gained the most elected councillors in its history, bringing its total to 445, leading two councils and joining various coalition administrations running 17 other councils. The party formed an alliance with the Liberal Democrats to create an administration for Oxfordshire County Council.

The 2022 United Kingdom local elections again saw gains for the Green Party with 63 in England and 8 in Wales taking the party to a historic high of 545 councillors on 166 different councils. As of July 2022, the Green Party run Brighton and Hove City Council as a minority administration and lead coalitions running Lancaster and Stroud councils.

See also
 Anti-nuclear movement in the United Kingdom
 Green Left (England and Wales)
 List of advocates of republicanism in the United Kingdom
 List of green parties
 Politics of the United Kingdom

Notes

References

Sources

Further reading
 
 
 James Dennison. 2020. "How Niche Parties React to Losing Their Niche: The Cases of the Brexit Party, the Green Party and Change UK." Parliamentary Affairs, Volume 73, Pages 125–141

External links

LGBTIQA+ Greens
Green Party Trade Union Group
Young Greens

Green Party of England and Wales
1990 establishments in England
1990 establishments in Wales
Articles containing video clips
European Green Party
Left-wing parties in the United Kingdom
Political parties in England
Political parties in Wales
Political parties supporting universal basic income
Progressive parties